Jamshed Usmonov (born 13 January 1965), also credited as Djamshed Usmonov, is a Tajik film director, producer, scriptwriter and one of the most notable figures of contemporary Persian cinema.

He studied at the Dushanbe Fine Arts School in Dushanbe and  Director's School in Moscow. His film To Get to Heaven, First You Have to Die, was screened in the Un Certain Regard section at the 2006 Cannes Film Festival.

Filmography
 1998: Flight of the Bee
 2002: Angel on the Right
 2006: To Get to Heaven, First You Have to Die
 2011: My Wife's Romance

Awards and honors 
The Flight of the Bee

Torino Film Festival 1998 : Grand Prix, Audience Award, Fipresci Prize

Thessaloniki Film Festival 1998 : Silver Alexander. 
 
Angel on the Right

Official Selection Cannes Film Festival 2002, “Un Certain Regard”

Special Jury Prize Angers 2003,

Special Jury Prize Tokyo Filmex 2003,

Grand Prix Tromso 2003,

Grand Prix Barcelona Asian Film Festival,
 
FIPRESCI Prize at the 2002 London Film Festival.

To Get to Heaven, First You Have to Die
 
Official Selection Cannes Film Festival 2006, “Un Certain Regard”

Grand Prix Tokyo Filmex 2006

See also 
Iranian cinema
Tajikistan

References

External links
 
Kiarostami's "Friend's home" brought me back to cinema (An interview with Jamshid Usmanov) (in Persian)

Ethnic Tajik people
Tajikistani film directors
Persian-language film directors
1965 births
Living people